Khaleel is an Indian artist who lives in Hyderabad, India. He is the son of the artist Aziz.

References

External links
 Atiya Amjad' 
 Gayatri Rajwade, The Tribune page - "Nature Perfect"
 Khaleel's webpage

Artists from Hyderabad, India
Painters from Andhra Pradesh
Indian male painters
Living people
20th-century Indian painters
Year of birth missing (living people)
20th-century Indian male artists